Nathaniel Briggs Durfee (September 29, 1812 – November 9, 1872) was a U.S. Representative from Rhode Island.

Born in Tiverton, Rhode Island, Durfee completed preparatory studies.
He engaged in agricultural pursuits and conducted a fruit orchard.
He served as member of the Rhode Island House of Representatives for eleven years.

Durfee was elected as a candidate of the American Party to the Thirty-fourth Congress and as a Republican to the Thirty-fifth Congress (March 4, 1855 – March 3, 1859).
He resumed his former pursuits.
He was serving as county clerk at the time of his death in Tiverton, Rhode Island, on November 9, 1872.
He was interred in the family burial ground near Tiverton, Rhode Island.

Sources

1812 births
1872 deaths
People from Tiverton, Rhode Island
Rhode Island Know Nothings
Know-Nothing members of the United States House of Representatives from Rhode Island
Republican Party members of the United States House of Representatives from Rhode Island
Republican Party members of the Rhode Island House of Representatives
19th-century American politicians